Goriška Vas is a small village in the Municipality of Mirna Peč in southeastern Slovenia. The municipality is included in the Southeast Slovenia Statistical Region. The area is part of the traditional region of Lower Carniola.

References

External links
Goriška Vas on Geopedia

Populated places in the Municipality of Mirna Peč